Three Sparrows and a Bit (Spanish: Tres gorriones y pico) is a 1964 Spanish film directed by Antonio del Amo.

Cast
 Marta Baizán
 Roberto Cruz 
 Luis Mariano Duque
 José Luis López Vázquez 
 José Marco 
 Raúl Martinea Victoriano 
 Mary Paz Pondal 
 Enrique San Francisco

References

Bibliography 
 de España, Rafael. Directory of Spanish and Portuguese film-makers and films. Greenwood Press, 1994.

External links 
 

1964 films
Spanish comedy films
1960s Spanish-language films
Films directed by Antonio del Amo
1960s Spanish films